The Benedictine Sisters of Perpetual Adoration are a congregation of sisters that follow the Rule of St. Benedict and have a Eucharistic charism. They are located at their monastery in Clyde, Missouri.

History
The original monastery was founded in 1874 by a group of five sisters led by Mary Anselma Felber, O.S.B. who came from the young monastery of Maria-Rickenbach (founded 1857) in Switzerland. Arriving in Clyde, Missouri, they founded the Benedictine Convent of Perpetual Adoration. This remains the motherhouse and largest community of the congregation. It houses 550 documented relics of the saints. The decision to come was sparked by the departure of a group of monks from the nearby Engelberg Abbey, at a time when monastic communities felt threatened by political changes taking place throughout Europe. As with many other monastic groups, they looked to the New World for a place of refuge. The monks went on to found Conception Abbey in nearby Conception, Missouri, and began to minister to German and Irish immigrants of the region. It is a tradition that the Benedictine Sisters join the monks for evening prayer and supper each year on Easter Monday; the monks, in turn, join the Sisters on the feast of St. Scholastica.

Like the monastery in Switzerland, the sisters devoted much skill to the art of ecclesiastical embroidery, and assiduously cultivated the singing of plainchant. The sisters began teaching the immigrant children and before long they opened St. Joseph's Academy, and ran an orphanage.

Since the early 1900s, they established monasteries in Chewelah, Washington; Mundelein, Illinois; Tucson, Arizona; Kansas City, Missouri; St. Louis, Missouri; San Diego, California; and Sand Springs, Oklahoma. Additionally, the San Benito Monastery in Dayton, Wyoming was established in 1989 and closed down in 2014.

Benedictine Sisters Monastery (Tucson, Arizona)
The Benedictine Sisters first came to Tucson in 1935 at the invitation of the local bishop, Daniel Gercke. In 1940, they moved into the Spanish-Renaissance-style Benedictine Sisters Monastery, which was designed by architect Roy Place, who also designed the old Pima County Courthouse, Tucson's veterans hospital, and some notable campus buildings of the University of Arizona. The building is widely acknowledged as a classic of mission style architecture. The Tucson monastery closed in 2018 and the sisters relocated to the Missouri motherhouse.

Present day
The congregation's monastery is in Clyde, Missouri. The sisters follow a simple, contemplative way of life, formed by the Rule of St. Benedict. As of 2016, there were sixty-one members.  They support themselves by producing Altar Breads, soap, liturgical vestments and gourmet popcorn. They are sold under the name "Monastery Creations"; the soaps and lotions are produced onsite in a building that was once in 1927 as a slaughterhouse when the monastery had a large dairy and livestock operation. "Monastery Scents" offers several different kinds of soap, lotions, salves, lip balm and candles sold in the monastery’s gift shop and online.

Low gluten hosts developed by the group
The sisters produce low-gluten hosts safe for celiacs, which has been approved by the Catholic Church for use at Mass. The hosts are made and packaged in a dedicated wheat-free / gluten-free environment. Gluten content analysis found no detectable amount of gluten, though the reported gluten content is 0.01% as that was the lowest limit of detection possible with the utilized analysis technique. In an article from the Catholic Review (15 February 2004) gastroenterologist Alessio Fasano was quoted as declaring these hosts "perfectly safe for celiac sufferers."

See also
 Benedictine Sisters of the Reparation of the Holy Face

Notes

Sources
Innes, Stephanie. "Midtown nuns to thank Knights with special Mass", azstarnet, August 6, 2007
Spirit&Life(ISSN 0038-7592), published bimonthly by the Benedictine Sisters of Perpetual Adoration, 800 N. Country Club Rd., Tucson, AZ 85716

External links
Official site of the Congregation
Website of the founding monastery in Switzerland (German)
Website of the Arizona monastery
 Clyde Monastery Chapel Tour
 Q & A with Sr. Cathleen Timberlake, making premium handmade soap
 Historical pamphlets published by the Benedictine Sisters of Perpetual Adoration in Clyde

Benedictine nunneries in the United States
Catholic female orders and societies
Religious organizations established in 1874
Catholic Church in Missouri
1874 establishments in Missouri
Catholic religious institutes established in the 19th century